Virve Koppel (7 October 1931 Tallinn – 26 May 2016) was an Estonian television and film director.

In 1956 she graduated from Lunacharsky State Institute for Theatre Arts (GITIS). 1956-1989 she worked as an editor and director at Eesti Televisioon.

Awards:
 1975: Estonian SSR merited cultural personnel

Filmography
Filmography:
 Pööripäev (1964)
 Reportaaž telefoniraamatu järgi (with Mati Põldre, 1966)
 Meestele (1967)
 Mina ise (1969)
 Kivikasukas (1969)
 Poiste saar (1977)
 Maa keset merd (1981)

References

1931 births
2016 deaths
Estonian women film directors
People from Tallinn